Reform of the date of Easter refers to proposals to change the date for the annual celebration of Easter. These proposals include setting a fixed date or agreeing between Eastern and Western Christendom a common basis for calculating the date of Easter so that all Christians celebrate the Festival on the same day. As of 2022, no such agreement has been reached.

Description
A reform of the date of Easter has been proposed several times because the current system for determining the date of Easter is seen as presenting two significant problems:
 Its date varies from year to year. It can fall on up to 35 days in March and April of the respective calendar. While many Christians do not consider this to be a problem, it can cause frequent difficulties of co-ordination with civil calendars, for example academic terms. Many countries have public holidays around Easter weekend or tied to the date of Easter but spread from February to June, such as Shrove Tuesday or Ascension and Pentecost.
 Many Eastern churches calculate the date of Easter using the Julian calendar, whereas some Eastern churches use the Revised Julian calendar and all Western churches and civil authorities have adopted the Gregorian reforms for all calendrical purposes. Hence in most years, Easter is celebrated on a later date in the East than in the West.

There have been controversies about the "correct" date of Easter since antiquity, but most Christian churches today agree on certain points. Easter should therefore be celebrated:
 on a Sunday according to the Council of Nicaea in 325,
 after the Northward equinox, which ecclesiastically is on 21 March in the Gregorian calendar; that is in Northern Hemisphere spring and Southern Hemisphere autumn,
 after the nominal "Paschal" full moon.

There is less agreement whether Easter also should occur:
 so that Annunciation—celebrated 25 March, 9 months before Christmas—does not fall on any day from the Sunday before Easter to the Sunday after,
 on or after the 14th day of the lunar month of Nisan,
 not before Jewish Pesach – Easter is after Christian Passover by definition.

The disagreements have been particularly about the determination of moon phases and the equinox, some still preferring astronomical observation from a certain location (usually Jerusalem, Alexandria, Rome or local), most others following nominal approximations of these in either the Hebrew, Julian or Gregorian calendar using different lookup tables and cycles in their algorithms. Deviations may also result from different customs for the start of the day, i.e. dusk, sunset, midnight, dawn or sunrise. Furthermore, it may be accepted to have the respective starts of the astronomical season, the full moon and the Sunday may occur in a single calendar day as long as they are observed in that order.

Fixed date 

It has been proposed that the first problem could be resolved by making Easter occur on a date fixed relative to the western Gregorian calendar every year, or alternatively on a Sunday within a fixed range of seven or eight dates. While tying Easter to one fixed date would serve to underline the belief that it commemorates an actual historical event, without an accompanying calendar reform that changes the pattern of the days of the week (itself a subject of religious controversy) or adopted a leap week, it would also break the tradition of Easter always being on a Sunday, established since the 2nd century and by now deeply embedded in the liturgical practice and theological understanding of almost all Christian denominations.

The Second Vatican Council agreed in 1963 to accept a fixed Sunday in the Gregorian calendar as the date for Easter as long as other Christian churches agreed on it as well. They also agreed in principle to adopt a civil calendar reform as long as there were never any days outside the cycle of seven days per week.

The Pepuzites, a 5th-century sect, celebrated Easter on the Sunday following April 6 (in the Julian calendar). This is equivalent to the Sunday closest to April 9. The April 6 date was apparently arrived at because it was equivalent to the 14th of the month of Artemisios in an earlier calendar used in the area, hence, the 14th of the first month of spring.

The two most widespread proposals for fixing the date of Easter would set it on either the second Sunday in April (8 to 14, week 14 or 15), or the Sunday after the second Saturday in April (9 to 15). They only differ in years with dominical letter G or AG where 1 April is a Sunday. In both schemes, account has been taken of the fact that—in spite of the many difficulties in establishing the dates of the historical events involved—many scholars attribute a high degree of probability to Friday 7 April 30, as the date of the crucifixion of Jesus, which would make 9 April the date of the Resurrection. Another date which is supported by many scholars is 3 April 33, making 5 April the date of the Resurrection.

In the late 1920s and 1930s, this idea gained some momentum along with other calendar reform proposals, such as the International Fixed Calendar and the World Calendar. In 1928, a law was passed in the United Kingdom authorising an Order in Council which would fix the date of Easter in that country as the Sunday after the second Saturday in April. However, this was never implemented.

The Sunday after the first Wednesday in April would always be in ISO week 14, except for leap years starting on Thursday (DC) where the week count is one higher than in otherwise equivalent common years after February. The Symmetry454 Calendar proposes a fixed date of Easter in week 14, which would agree with the aforementioned proposals in most years, but would be 1 week earlier in F/GF years (like the only deviation of the Pepuzite definition) and also in DC, D/ED and E/FE years.

The Sunday of an ordinal ISO week n is also the nth Sunday of the year, except in A/AG, B/BA and C/CB years where it is the n+1st Sunday, so both major proposals put Easter on the 15th Sunday of the year except either in common years starting on Monday (G), where 8 April, i.e. the second Sunday in April, is the 14th Sunday of the year, or in leap years starting on Sunday (AG), where 15 April, i.e. the Sunday after the second Saturday in April, is the 16th Sunday of the year.

{| class="wikitable" style="text-align:center;"
|+ Weeks for currently possible dates of Easter Sunday; proposed and special dates highlighted
|-
!scope=col rowspan=2| Sunday of the year
!scope=col colspan=14|Dominical letter
!scope=col rowspan=2| ISO week
!scope=col rowspan=2| Month
|-
| AG || A || BA || B || CB || C
| DC || D || ED || E || FE || F || GF || G
|-
! 12th
|colspan=7  ||colspan=2| 22 ||colspan=2| 23 ||colspan=2| 24 ||title="Annunciation"| 25
!rowspan=2| W12 !!rowspan=3 scope=rowgroup| March
|-
!rowspan=2| 13th
|title="Annunciation"| 25 ||colspan=2| 26 ||colspan=2| 27 || 28
|colspan=8|
|-
|colspan=6|
| 28 ||colspan=2| 29 ||colspan=2| 30 ||colspan=2| 31 || 01
!rowspan=2| W13
|-
!rowspan=2| 14th
| 01 ||colspan=2| 02 ||colspan=2| 03 || 04
|colspan=8|
!rowspan=8 scope=rowgroup| April
|-
|colspan=6|
| title="Sym454"  ||colspan=2 title="Sym454; historical date if in year 33"  ||colspan=2 title="Sym454"  ||colspan=2 title="Pepuzite, Sym454"  ||title="Pepuzite, Sym454, 2nd April Sunday" 
!rowspan=2| W14
|-
!rowspan=2| 15th
|title="in all major proposals"  ||colspan=2 title="in all major proposals; historical date if in year 30"  ||colspan=2 title="in all major proposals"  ||title="in all major proposals" 
|colspan=8 
|-
|colspan=6 
|title="2nd April Sunday, Sunday after 2nd April Saturday, Pepuzite"  ||colspan=2 title="2nd April Sunday, Sunday after 2nd April Saturday, Pepuzite"  ||colspan=2 title="2nd April Sunday, Sunday after 2nd April Saturday, Pepuzite"  ||colspan=2 title="2nd April Sunday, Sunday after 2nd April Saturday"  || title="2nd April Sunday, Sunday after 2nd April Saturday" 
!rowspan=2| W15
|-
!rowspan=2| 16th
|title="Sunday after 2nd April Saturday"  ||colspan=2| 16 ||colspan=2| 17 || 18
|colspan=8|
|-
|colspan=6|
| 18 ||colspan=2| 19 ||colspan=2| 20 ||colspan=2| 21 || 22
!rowspan=2| W16
|-
!rowspan=2| 17th
| 22 ||colspan=2| 23 ||colspan=2| 24 || 25
|colspan=8|
|-
|colspan=6 
| 25
|colspan=7 
! W17
|}

In 1977, some Eastern Orthodox representatives objected to separating the date of Easter from lunar phases.

Unified date 

Proposals to resolve the second problem have made greater progress, but they are yet to be adopted.

1923 proposal 

An astronomical rule for Easter was proposed by the 1923 Pan-Orthodox Congress of Constantinople that also proposed the Revised Julian calendar: Easter was to be the Sunday after the midnight-to-midnight day at the meridian of the Church of the Holy Sepulchre in Jerusalem (35° 13′ 47.2″ E or UT + 2h 20m 55s for the small dome) during which the first full moon after the vernal equinox occurs.

Although the instant of the full moon must occur after the instant of the vernal equinox, it may occur on the same day. If the full moon occurs on a Sunday, Easter is the following Sunday. This proposed astronomical rule was rejected by all Orthodox churches and was never considered by any Western church.

1997 proposal 

The World Council of Churches (WCC) proposed a reform of the method of determining the date of Easter at a summit in Aleppo, Syria, in 1997: Easter would be defined as the first Sunday following the first astronomical full moon following the astronomical vernal equinox, as determined from the meridian of Jerusalem. The reform would have been implemented starting in 2001, since in that year the Eastern and Western dates of Easter would coincide.

This reform has not been implemented. It would have relied mainly on the co-operation of the Eastern Orthodox Church, since the date of Easter would change for them immediately; whereas for the Western churches, the new system would not differ from that currently in use until 2019. However, Eastern Orthodox support was not forthcoming, and the reform failed. The much greater impact that this reform would have had on the Eastern churches in comparison with those of the West led some Orthodox to suspect that the WCC's decision was an attempt by the West to impose its viewpoint unilaterally on the rest of the world under the guise of ecumenism. However, it could also be argued that it is fair to ask a significant change of Eastern Christians, as they would be simply making the same substantial changes the various Western Churches have already made in 1582 (when the Catholic Church first adopted the Gregorian calendar) and subsequent years so as to bring the calendar and Easter more in line with the seasons.

2008–2009 proposals 

In 2008 and 2009, there was a new attempt to reach a consensus on a unified date on the part of Catholic, Orthodox and Protestant leaders. This effort largely relies on earlier work carried out during the 1997 Aleppo conference. It was organized by academics working at the Institute of Ecumenical Studies of Lviv University.

Part of this attempt was reportedly influenced by ecumenical efforts in Syria and Lebanon, where the Greek-Melkite Church has played an important role in improving ties with the Orthodox. There is also a series of apparition phenomena known as Our Lady of Soufanieh that has urged for a common date of Easter.

2014–2016 proposals 
In May 2015, on the anniversary of the meeting between himself and Pope Francis, Coptic Pope Tawadros II wrote a letter to Pope Francis asking for him to consider making renewed effort at a unified date for Easter.

In response, on 12 June 2015, Catholic Pope Francis remarked to the International Catholic Charismatic Renewal Services 3rd World Retreat of Priests at the Basilica of Saint John Lateran in Rome that "we have to come to an agreement" for a common date on Easter. , a historian, writing in the Vatican daily newspaper L'Osservatore Romano, said the Pope is offering this initiative to change the date of Easter "as a gift of unity with the other Christian churches" adding that a common date for Easter would encourage "reconciliation between the Christian churches and ... a sort of making sense out of the calendar". A week later Aphrem II, the Syriac Orthodox Patriarch of Antioch, met with Pope Francis and noted that the celebration of Easter "on two different dates is a source of great discomfort and weakens the common witness of the church in the world."

In January 2016, the Archbishop of Canterbury, Justin Welby, announced that he on behalf of the Anglican Communion had joined discussions with Catholic, Coptic, and Orthodox representatives over a fixed date for Easter, and that he hoped it would happen within the next 5–10 years. Welby has suggested that Easter be fixed on either the second or third Sunday of April, relative to the Gregorian calendar. This proposal remains to be approved, especially by Eastern churches, which currently determine Easter using the Julian calendar.

According to international standards, Easter Sunday ends the week containing Good Friday and the week of the second Sunday in April has the ordinal number 14 or 15 (dominical letters D/DC, E/ED, F/FE and GF, i.e. 46.25% of years), hence the third Sunday is one respective week later. There currently is no public proposal under discussion that used a fixed week of the year for Easter and dependent feasts. The second Sunday in April is usually the 15th Sunday of the year (except for dominical letter G, 10.75%), which is almost always also the Sunday after the second Saturday in April (except for dominical letter AG, 3.75%).

See also 
 Computus
 Easter controversy

References

External links 
 
 
 An Orthodox article arguing for preservation of the current method of calculating the date of Pascha
 The Date of Easter: Science offers solution to ancient religious problem

Calendars
Easter date